Gilda Dent (née Gold), occasionally referred to as Grace, is a fictional character who has appeared in Batman comic books since Detective Comics #66 (August 1942). Associated with her fiancé (later husband) Harvey Dent, who becomes the criminal mastermind Two-Face, she has since been a recurring character throughout various Batman stories involving him. Her largest role is in the Jeph Loeb and Tim Sale collaboration Batman: The Long Halloween and she was voiced by Julie Nathanson in the animated adaptation. Her role as Dent's fiancé in Christopher Nolan's The Dark Knight was instead filled by the original character of Rachel Dawes, portrayed by Katie Holmes, and Maggie Gyllenhaal.

Fictional character biography

Pre-Crisis
In her first appearance Gilda Gold is the fiancée of Harvey Kent (later renamed Dent), the brilliant and handsome district attorney of Gotham City. Gangster Boss Maroni throws acid in Harvey's face during Maroni's trial, scarring half of his face and warping his mind. Because Gilda is a sculptor, Harvey believes that she worships beauty; therefore (in Dent's mind), neither she—nor anyone else—could ever love or accept a person with such a monstrously "hideous" face as his. Gilda creates a bust of Harvey, which he smashes with a mallet to symbolize his new, ruined self. Even as Two-Face begins a dual career of crime and Robin Hood-style philanthropy, however, he still longs passionately for Gilda, and she for him.

In Detective Comics #80 (1943), she is in the audience when Two-Face and his gang try to rob a classical concert. Gilda follows Two-Face to his hideout, just as Batman and Robin burst in. When Two-Face, having the drop on the Caped Crusader, pulls his gun and opens fire upon his former ally, Gilda leaps in front of the bullet. Pleading to Harvey that she had to make him "understand… before it was too late…", she passes out, shocking Two-Face into thinking he's killed her. Two-Face turns himself in and Gilda is sent to the hospital.

When Two-Face learns from the doctors that Gilda has lost the will to live, he vows to give up his life of crime. After a final tussle with the last of his men, he undergoes plastic surgery and is released from jail after one year. His face and sanity restored, Harvey Kent promises to finally marry Gilda.

In Superman Family #211, Harvey Kent (causing confusion with the name of Clark Kent) and Gilda attend the wedding of Bruce Wayne and Selina Kyle (the now-retired Catwoman). It is presumed that this version of Harvey and Gilda live happily ever after.

Earth-One
Gilda did not return to comics again until the late 1970s in Teen Titans #48 (June 1977), where Harlequin (Duela Dent) claims to be her daughter, conceived apparently during the brief period seen in Batman #234 where Harvey Dent is cured. After Dent's reversion to Two-Face (also seen in flashback in Batman #234), Gilda leaves Dent. She is seen carrying baby Duela in one hand and a suitcase in the other.

In Batman #328, it is revealed that Gilda remarried Dave Stevens, Harvey Dent's former assistant. Stevens is murdered by Maroni, who is subsequently killed by Two-Face as revenge for causing Gilda pain. Two-Face disguises himself as a man named Carl Ternison and courts the newly widowed Gilda, trying to have a normal life with her.

When Gilda discovers the truth, Two-Face's madness escalates, and he eventually traps Batman inside an abandoned courthouse. However, before he can pull the trigger, Gilda intercedes, swearing that if he kills Batman, she will think of him only as a murderer and never forgive him. She gives him an ultimatum: "Will it be vengeance or hope?" Torn apart, Two-Face breaks down and begs her for help. He is arrested, but Gilda promises to be there for him as long as he wants to get better.

Post-Crisis
Her role in Harvey Dent's past was updated into the currently prominent Two-Face origin: Batman Annual #14 (1990), a story called "Eye of the Beholder". In this story, it is revealed that Dent's father was an abusive alcoholic who would nightly play a game with his young son: "I'll flip a coin: if it's heads, I beat you. Tails, I don't". Dent spends a lifetime burying his rage and resentment, only to discover that the coin was two-headed all along. While Dent is torn between loving and resenting his father, Gilda clearly despises him; she scoffs that after a lifetime of abuse and cruelty, the only thing Dent's father ever gave him was a coin.

Gilda tries to comfort Dent as his sanity deteriorates. She pleads with him when, upon awakening from a nightmare, he races out of their bed in the middle of the night and goes to his office, "where it's safe". After Harvey is disfigured, Gilda visits him in the hospital to try to give him back the coin. It was in his pocket during the trial, and was also hit by some acid, scarring one side of the coin. She last appears in this story right after Two-Face murders his corrupt former assistant, Adrian Fields, tearfully explaining Dent's abuse history to Batman.

Gilda does not reappear until Secret Origins Special #1, where she (here named Grace) appears on a TV talk show focusing on Gotham's villains. She talks about a time when one of the criminals Dent put away as D.A. returned for revenge by taking her hostage. Two-Face eventually rescued her, beating the ex-con to the point of death, but holding off because Grace demanded he stop. This represents a rare case where Two-Face is not influenced by the coin, but rather by someone else's welfare. She tries once again to appeal to his "good" side, but fails. At the end of the interview, she professes her belief that, one day, Dent would return to her.

Gilda returns in Batman: Two-Face Strikes Twice. Here, she finds herself at odds with her now-ex-husband, as he believes their marriage failed because he was unable to give her children. She later marries Paul Janus, a reference to the Roman god of doors who had two faces, one facing forward, the other backward. Two-Face attempts to frame Janus as a criminal by kidnapping him and replacing him with a stand-in, whom Two-Face "disfigures" with makeup to make it look as if Janus has gone insane just as Two-Face had. Two-Face is eventually caught by Batman and sent away, and Gilda and Janus reunite. Years later, Gilda gives birth to twins named James and Luke, prompting Two-Face to escape once more and take the twins hostage, as he erroneously believes them to be conceived by Janus using an experimental fertility drug. The end of the book reveals a surprise twist; Batman learns from Gilda that Janus is not the father of Gilda's twins - Dent is. Some of his sperm had been frozen after a death threat had been made against him, and she used some of it to get pregnant. Batman uses this information to convince Dent to free the twins and turn himself in.

Post-Zero Hour

After the events of Zero Hour: Crisis in Time, Gilda's entire history has been revised. She has a larger role and story arc in The Long Halloween, a maxi-series that is part of Two-Face's origin in Batman Annual #14. During the nearly year-long story, a serial killer called Holiday systematically murders prominent gangsters. During the series, Gilda's marriage to Dent shows signs of strain; she wants to settle down and start a family, while he is obsessed with capturing Holiday. In a private monologue at the end, Gilda states that she was the original Holiday killer, having committed all of the murders up until New Year's Eve. Gilda indicates that Dent murdered Alberto Falcone on New Year's Eve, taking her place, and that he was the one responsible for the crimes from that point on. The confession is only known to readers, since Alberto confessed to all the Holiday murders upon his capture. Gilda destroys the evidence of her crimes and leaves Gotham City.

Due to the success of The Long Halloween, the events of the story have generally been accepted into continuity as the "official" story of Batman's early years, given that Zero Hour retconned the events of Batman: Year Two and rendered them non-canonical. In Batman: Dark Victory, the Calendar Man is about to reveal Holiday's true identity, but an enraged Two-Face cuts him off.

In Greg Rucka's novelization of Batman: No Man's Land, Dent thinks that Gilda is dead.

Post-Infinite Crisis
In the "One Year Later" story arc Batman: Face the Face, Dent mentions Gilda when recalling his past life, but the Two-Face persona states "No, Harvey. She's gone now".

During Dick Grayson's tenure as Batman, she appears standing over a wounded Harvey Dent. The Riddler reveals that she faked her death and was institutionalized following The Long Halloween, where she met Mario Falcone, who suffered a similar breakdown following the event of Dark Victory. After getting involved upon their release, Falcone kept Gilda like a prisoner, and she conspired with the Riddler to steal Two-Face's coin and entice him to rescue her. Knowing that Falcone was on Dent's tail, Gilda faked Harvey's death by appearing to shoot him at point-blank range. When they were finally reunited, she explained how much she missed him, and that she now believed in Two-Face as well as Harvey Dent. Feeling betrayed and manipulated, Two-Face tried to kill her, but hesitated, only to be stopped by Batman. To save Harvey, she shot Batman with a .22, knocking him out and allowing them both to escape. Her ultimate fate remains unknown, and Dick even expressed doubt that she was in fact the real Gilda Dent.

New 52
In the New 52 reboot, Gilda is a socialite that Bruce Wayne introduces to Harvey at a graduation party. She is killed in front of Harvey by Erin McKillen.

Other versions

Flashpoint
In the alternate timeline of the Flashpoint event, Harvey Dent has a wife and twin children. When the Joker kidnaps Dent's children, Mrs. Dent is emotional while her husband asks Batman for help in their search.

In other media

Film
 A Victorian era version of Gilda makes a cameo appearance in the animated adaptation of Gotham by Gaslight.
 Gilda appears in the two-part animated film Batman: The Long Halloween, voiced by Julie Nathanson. This version takes the blame as the Holiday Killer, motivated by her anger at the Falcones after she had a past relationship with Alberto that ended with Falcone ending the marriage and forcing Gilda to get an abortion of her and Alberto's child.

Television
 A character analogous to Gilda, Grace Lamont, appeared in Batman: The Animated Series, voiced by Murphy Cross. In the episode "Two-Face", she is Harvey Dent's fiancée. Alongside Dent's best friend Bruce Wayne, she watches helplessly as Dent loses his grip on sanity while going after gangster Rupert Thorne. After Dent is disfigured and becomes Two-Face, Thorne plots to use Grace against his new rival. A couple of Thorne's men disguise themselves as police officers and offer Grace a handheld tracking device, in case Two-Face ever approaches her. Two-Face eventually does, bringing her to his lair and wearing a scarf to cover his scars. She nearly succeeds in persuading Two-Face to reform, when Thorne's men show up, revealing that Grace inadvertently betrayed him. Nevertheless, Grace helps Batman and Two-Face fight off Thorne's men, and remains by his side as he is taken into custody with Thorne.

Miscellaneous
 Grace returned to animated continuity in the comic series The Batman and Robin Adventures issues #1 and 2, where the Joker manipulates Two-Face into thinking that Grace and Bruce are having an affair. Two-Face abducts her and tries to kill Robin, but is ultimately thwarted when Grace jabs the jagged edge of the scarred coin into the disfigured side of his face. The story ends with Grace leaving Two-Face upon realizing that Harvey Dent is gone forever.
 Grace appears again in The Batman and Robin Adventures issue #22, in which Two-Face's life is thrown into chaos when he loses his coin during an unplanned breakout from Arkham Asylum, and is forced to replace it with a quarter. Little Jonni Infantino, the mastermind behind the breakout, threatens to hurt Grace if Two-Face doesn't provide information on one of Rupert Thorne's thugs, Weird Tony Hendra, whom Two-Face prosecuted as Harvey Dent.

References

Characters created by Bob Kane
Characters created by Bill Finger
Comics characters introduced in 1942
DC Comics female supervillains
Fictional characters from New Jersey
Fictional sculptors
Fictional serial killers